Borsetti is an Italian surname. Notable people with the surname include:

Bartolomeo Carlo Borsetti (1689– 1759), Italian Baroque painter
Ermes Borsetti (1913–2005), Italian footballer
Pietro Borsetti (1882–1955), Italian gymnast

Italian-language surnames